Montalvânia is a municipality in the northernmost point of the state of Minas Gerais in Brazil.  As of 2020 the population was 14,747 in an area of 1,484.388 km2. The elevation of the municipal seat is 510 meters, the postal code (CEP) is 39495-000 and it is located in the microregion of Januária

Economy 
The economy is based on agriculture with emphasis on cattle raising.  There were 41,000 head in 2006.  The main agricultural crops were corn, manioc, sugarcane, and rice.  The GDP was R$47,000,000 in 2005.

Quality of life 
Illiteracy rate: 29.51% (older than 16)--the rate for the state was 11.96% (2000)
Infant mortality rate: 34.48—the rate for the state was 17.40
Urbanization rate: 52%--the rate for the state was 80% (2000)

Transportation 
The main highways of access are BR-135 and BR-030. The Cavernas do Peruaçu National Park lies to the south near Itacarambi. The boundary with the state of Bahia lies to the north. The municipal seat is 64 km. south of the São Francisco River.

The streets are named after philosophers and thinkers like Buddha, Confucious, Homer, Plato, and Mohamed. The founder of the town was Antônio Montalvão (1917-1992), a local rancher who donated the land to build lots. He believed that extraterrestrials had used the region as a base to capture energy for their space travels. According to him inscriptions on rocks refer to space ships and rituals practiced between extraterrestrials and humans.

References

IBGE
Montalvânia City Hall
Social and Economic Indicators

External links
Montalvania online

Municipalities in Minas Gerais
Populated places established in 1952
1952 establishments in Brazil